Eslamabad Barg Beydi (also Romanized as Eslāmābād Barg Beydī; also known as Eslāmābād) is a village in Beyranvand-e Jonubi Rural District, Bayravand District, Khorramabad County, Lorestan Province, Iran. At the 2006 census, its population was 19, in 6 families.

References 

Towns and villages in Khorramabad County